Visarion Ljubiša (28 February 1823 – 14 April 1884) was the Serbian Orthodox metropolitan bishop of Montenegro from 1882 to 1884.

Early life and schooling
Stefan Ljubiša was born in the village of Sveti Stefan to the Paštrovići clan. He lost his father, who was a sailor like many of his compatriots, when he was only three. When he reached school age, his mother sent him to his grandfather, Abbot Savo Ljubiša, at the Praskvica monastery. He completed his primary education in a lay school in Risan and was then sent the Orthodox clerical school in Šibenik, which in 1841 was elevated to the rank of seminary during his studies there.

Visarion was first cousin of famous writer Stjepan Mitrov Ljubiša.

In the church
After he finished his studies in 1844, he returned to Praskvica, where he became a monk and was consecrated as a priest. Subsequently, he served as a teacher in monastery schools (often the only existing schools in those days) in Praskvica, Podlastva, Podmaine, Reževići Monastery, and Savina (all in the littoral). In 1858, he was appointed priest and teacher in Perast. In 1867, he became the abbot of monastery Morača in Montenegro and two years later the abbot of the Cetinje Monastery (which was the seat of metropolitan) and professor to the newly opened seminary. From 1872 to 1875 he was the rector of the Cetinje Seminary. During the Montenegrin-Ottoman War (1876–78), he was appointed as military priest attached to the general staff. His dignified and brave behavior made it to the folk epic song. In 1876 he became the president of the newly founded Red Cross of Montenegro. From 1878 to 1882, he was the head of the Zahumsko-Raška eparchy, founded in the newly liberated territories of Montenegro. His seat was in Ostrog Monastery which he enlarged. His work as bishop was devoted and thorough; especially important was the fact that Ljubiša introduced pedant church administration that he knew well from his earlier work in the Littoral.

Metropolitan
After the death of [[Ilar
ion Roganović]], and the administration of abbot Mitrofan Ban, on 6 December 1882, Ljubiša became the Metropolitan of Montenegro. About the same time, the Ministry of Education of Montenegro was formed and Ljubiša, as an experienced teacher and organizer, became its first administrator. He was also a member of the State Council. He died of tuberculosis in 1884 and was buried in the courtyard of Vlaška Church in Cetinje. He left his house on main street in Cetinje to the poor.

References

Further reading
Pravoslavlje u Crnoj Gori, Cetinje 2006
Miroslav Luketić, Budva, Sveti Stefan, Petrovac, Budva - Cetinje 1966
Radoslav Grujić, Azbučnik Srpske pravoslavne crkve, Beograd 1993

1823 births
1884 deaths
19th-century Eastern Orthodox bishops
People from Budva
Serbs of Montenegro
People of the Principality of Montenegro
Bishops of Montenegro and the Littoral
Eastern Orthodox Christians from Montenegro
19th-century deaths from tuberculosis
Burials at Serbian Orthodox monasteries and churches
Tuberculosis deaths in Montenegro